Arbuthnott Parish Kirk is a church in Arbuthnott, Aberdeenshire, Scotland. Now a Category A listed building, it was built in at least the 13th century, from which time the nave and chancel survive. A west front and bell turret were added later. It was restored in 1896 by Alexander Marshall Mackenzie.

References

External links

Churches in Aberdeenshire
13th-century establishments in Scotland
13th-century churches
Category A listed buildings in Aberdeenshire
Listed churches in Scotland